Les Salopes, or the Naturally Wanton Pleasure of Skin is a Canadian drama film, directed by Renée Beaulieu and released in 2018. The film stars Brigitte Poupart as Marie-Claire, a dermatologist studying the role of skin in sexuality.

The cast also includes Pierre-Yves Cardinal, Vincent Leclerc, Louise Portal, Charlotte Aubin, Paul Ahmarani, Normand D'Amour, Romane Denis and Pierre Kwenders.

The film premiered at the 2018 Toronto International Film Festival.

References

External links
 

2018 films
2018 drama films
Canadian drama films
Quebec films
French-language Canadian films
2010s Canadian films
2010s French-language films